Lishness Peak is a peak,  high, in Owen Ridge near the south end of the Sentinel Range of the Ellsworth Mountains in Antarctica, rising at the east side of Nimitz Glacier,  southeast of Wilson Peak and  northwest of Bowers Corner. It was first mapped by the United States Geological Survey from surveys and U.S. Navy air photos from 1957 to 1959, and was named by the Advisory Committee on Antarctic Names for Alton R. Lishness, a radio operator on a U.S. Navy R4D exploratory flight to this area on January 28, 1958.

See also
 Mountains in Antarctica

Maps
 Vinson Massif.  Scale 1:250 000 topographic map.  Reston, Virginia: US Geological Survey, 1988.
 Antarctic Digital Database (ADD). Scale 1:250000 topographic map of Antarctica. Scientific Committee on Antarctic Research (SCAR). Since 1993, regularly updated.

References

Mountains of Ellsworth Land